Ras-e Sharqi (also Romanized as Ra’s-e Sharqī) is a village in Jazireh-ye Minu Rural District, Minu District, Khorramshahr County, Khuzestan Province, Iran. At the 2006 census, its population was 36, in 8 families.

References 

Populated places in Khorramshahr County